

La Lunatica

Lacuna

Lady Bullseye

Lady Deathstrike

Lady Dorma

Lady Grey

Lady Lark
Lady Lark (Linda Lewis), later named Skylark, is a character in the Marvel Comics series Squadron Supreme and hails from Earth-712. She first appeared in Avengers #85 (February 1971), and was created by Roy Thomas and John Buscema. She is based on Black Canary and later on Hawkgirl in DC Comics.

Linda Lewis was a singer before an enemy of the Squadron Supreme, Doctor Decibel, surgically implanted synthetic vocal cords into her throat, giving her the ability to generate a "sonic cry" which could incapacitate opponents. A reluctant hero at best, Linda often wished to return to her singing career.

She often partnered in crime-fighting, and later romantically, with the character Golden Archer (mirroring the relationship between the modern Black Canary and Green Arrow); however, she refused his marriage proposal. The Archer then used a mind-altering device to literally change her mind,  but this had the unintended side effect of altering her personality to an air-headed, vapid persona that put her feelings for the Archer above all other priorities.  When the Squadron finally learn this fact, Golden Archer is removed from the team, and Lark follows after him.  Lark disappeared for some time, next being seen at the end of the first year of the Squadron's Utopia program, having become separated from Golden Archer while still obsessive about him. 

When the Archer died under his later identity of the Black Archer, Lady Lark seemed to slowly shake off the effects of the mental modification, and returned to active status with the Squadron. Feeling she needed to increase her abilities to stand beside teammates that she perceived as more powerful, she began using the artificial wings that once belonged to deceased teammate Blue Eagle to gain the power of flight, and renamed herself Skylark. With this new ability came greater confidence, and Skylark became far more aggressive in combat than she had been as Lady Lark.

When returning to her native dimension with the team, she is injured and remanded to hospital care.

An alternate version of Lady Lark appears in the Supreme Power: Hyperion mini-series.

Lady Lotus

Lady Mastermind

Lady Octopus

Adria Lafayette 
Adria Lafayette is the mother of Lunella Lafayette / Moon Girl.

Publication history 
The character made her first appearance in Moon Girl and Devil Dinosaur #1 (2015), where the character was simply identified as Lunella's mother. She was first referred to as "Adria" in Moon Girl and Devil Dinosaur #1 (2022), as a nod to the upcoming Moon Girl and Devil Dinosaur animated series.

Aria Lafayette in other media 
 Adria Lafayette appears in the Disney Television Animation series Moon Girl and Devil Dinosaur, and is voiced by Sasheer Zamata. This version is a social activist who works as a DJ in her family's roller-skating rink.

James Lafayette 
James Lafayette is the father of Lunella Lafayette / Moon Girl.

Publication history 
The character first appeared in Moon Girl and Devil Dinosaur #1 (2015), referred simply as Moon Girl's father. He was first referred to as "James" in Moon Girl and Devil Dinosaur #1 (2022), in reference to the Moon Girl and Devil Dinosaur animated series.

James Lafayette in other media 
 James Lafayette appears in the Disney Television Animation series Moon Girl and Devil Dinosaur, voiced by Jermaine Fowler. This version is named "James Lafayette Jr.", and helps run his family's roller-skating rink.

Lamprey

Steven Lang

David Langford
Dr. David Langford is a fictional character appearing in American comic books published by Marvel Comics. Created by Len Kaminski and Ron Wagner, he first appeared in Morbius: The Living Vampire #1 (September 1992). A business partner to Doctor Paine, he worked to create Morbius, the Living Vampire's experimental blood disease cure which backfired (which is partially due to the Lilin Fang on Lilith's behalf and later turned into Bloodthrist) and killed Martine Bancroft to cover his actions, but ultimately killed by the Living Vampire out of vengeance.

Lascivious

Lasher
Lasher is the name used by a symbiote in Marvel Comics. The symbiote, created by David Michelinie and Ron Lim, first appeared in Venom: Lethal Protector #4 (May 1993), and was named in Carnage, U.S.A. #2 (March 2012). It was created as one of five symbiote "children" forcefully spawned from the Venom symbiote along with Riot, Agony, Phage and Scream. Lasher primarily uses symbiote tendrils.

Lasher's first host was Ramon Hernandez, a mercenary hired by Carlton Drake's Life Foundation in San Francisco. Hernandez bonded with Lasher in conjunction with Scream (Donna Diego), Agony (Leslie Gesneria), Riot (Trevor Cole) and Phage (Carl Mach). Lasher and his "siblings" are defeated by Spider-Man and Venom. They kidnap Eddie Brock in an attempt to communicate with their symbiotes in Chicago. When Brock refuses to aid them, Hernandez is killed by Diego, who developed schizophrenia due to Scream's influence.

Lasher's second host was Marcus Simms, a Lieutenant assigned to the Mercury Team. While Cletus Kasady is on the loose in Colorado, Marcus trains with Lasher in specific tasks alongside Riot (Howard Odgen), Phage (Rico Axelson) and Agony (James Murphy). Simms and his teammates are later killed by Carnage in their secret base, and the four symbiotes bond with Mercury Team's dog.

After being possessed by Knull, the four symbiotes possess a bickering family, with Lasher taking the daughter Sadie. The four head to New York to help Carnage and hunt Dylan Brock and Normie Osborn, but are defeated and separated from their respective hosts by the Maker. 

Lasher's fourth host is William, a senile and elderly individual. Manipulated by the Carnage symbiote, William is subsequently killed while Lasher takes a fifth host to help the symbiote enforcers participate in a conspiracy involving the Friends of Humanity. Nevertheless, they are defeated by Flash Thompson, Silence and Toxin and taken into Alchemax's custody.

Lasher in other media
 The Ramon Hernandez incarnation of Lasher appears as a boss in Spider-Man and Venom: Separation Anxiety.
 The Ramon Hernandez incarnation of Lasher appears as a playable character in Spider-Man Unlimited.

Laufey

Laughing Mask
The Laughing Mask (Dennis Burton) is a fictional character appearing in American comic books published by Marvel Comics. The character is a Timely Comics Golden Age superhero which appeared in Daring Mystery Comics #2, 1940, and reappeared in The Twelve. He was a deputy district attorney who took to murdering criminals in the vein of Marvel's later The Punisher, although the Laughing Mask used a phosphorescent mask to scare his victims prior to the kill.

His one Golden Age story was reprinted in The Twelve #0.

For unknown reasons he became The Purple Mask (Daring Mystery Comics #3-4) and was the cover feature on Daring Mystery Comics #3. The first Purple Mask story was reprinted in Daring Mystery 70th Anniversary Special.

Michael J. Vasallo identifies The Falcon (appearing in Daring Mystery Comics #5-6) as a revamp of The Purple Mask. That character was also a deputy district attorney, but his name was Carl Burgess and was, in terms of continuity, a distinct character. The Falcon appeared on the cover of Daring Mystery Comics #5. The Falcon did not kills his foes per se, but he allowed them to be killed by their own actions.

Lauri-Ell
Lauri-Ell is a Kree warrior and a supporting character in Kelly Thompson's 2020 run on Captain Marvel, first appearing in issue #18.

During the Empyre event, Captain Marvel is given Ronan's hammer by Hulkling and is officially made the Accuser of the newly-formed Kree/Skrull Alliance. Hulking sends Carol on a mission to K'in-Al, an experimental colony world where both Kree and Skrull could live together in peace and the first of its kind. Hulking reveals to Carol that the city was destroyed in an explosion and that his men had been in a stalemate with the one responsible ever since. Arriving on the scene, the suspect surrenders immediately and reveals herself to be Lauri-ell, a soldier who was artificially bred by Kree scientists using the DNA of two powerful warriors. Using the hammer, Carol sees a vision of her mother Mari-Ell, confirming that she and Lauri-Ell are half-sisters. Lauri-ell maintains that she is innocent but states that she understands that Carol's role as Accuser necessitates her arrest but Carol defies her orders and smuggles Lauri-Ell to Earth while she conducts her investigation into the bombing. Carol and her team discover that anti-Kree criminal Wastrel is responsible for destroying the colony and Lauri-Ell's name is cleared. During a battle with the Cotati, Lauri-Ell picks up the hammer when Carol is disabled and officially becomes the new Accuser.

Morgan le Fay

Leader

Leap-Frog

Leap-Frog is the alias of two fictional supervillains appearing in American comic books published by Marvel Comics. 

The characters use a frog suit that contains electrical coils on the soles of each of the two flippers, which allow the wearer to leap great distances up to 60 ft (18 m) high or 100 ft (30 m) long. The boots' power source is worn on their backs like a backpack, and triggered via hidden buttons in their gloves. Additionally, the costume later gained a strength-boosting exoskeleton along with substantial internal padding and a computer-guided system for leaping accuracy. The first Leap-Frog, Vincent Patillo, appeared in Daredevil #25-26 (February–March 1967), and was created by Stan Lee, Gene Colan, and Frank Giacoia while the second Leap-Frog, Buford Lange, debuted in Daredevil (vol. 2) #16 and was created by Brian Michael Bendis and David W. Mack.

Vincent Patilio
Following his wife Rose's death due to cancer-related illness, engineer Vincent Patilio became bitter and overwhelmed with grief. Wanting to provide better resources for his son Eugene and tired of his lack of success as an engineer for toy companies, Patilio attempted to make money with personal inventions. After having his work dismissed by others, Vincent decided his inventions could be used for crime. While in civilian clothes, Vincent tested shoes he equipped with his invention of electric "leaping coils" by leaping through a New York airport. Believing he could be a threat, police arrived on the scene, leading Patilio to protect himself by takes Matt Murdock hostage by chance. Satisfied the police would not attack, Patilio then leaves, declaring his test is done and he is now ready to strike "for real".

Vincent then incorporates the electric coils into a frog-like costume that provided better protection from impact and strong opponents. As Leap-Frog, he is quickly defeated by Daredevil. Afterwards, Murdock's law partner Foggy Nelson agrees to act as Patilio's defense attorney. In court, Patilio dons his Leap-Frog boots and flees through the windows before realizing the safety fasteners were removed by authorities. Rather than landing safely, he breaks one of his legs, foiling his own attempt to escape authorities. Later on, Leap-Frog accepts an offer from the criminal Electro to join the Emissaries of Evil, a team of villains targeting Daredevil for revenge. Despite their efforts, Daredevil defeats them. Later, Leap-Frog joins several villains who embark on a crime spree while declaring themselves to be new members of the Defenders team. The real Defenders (along with other heroes acting as Defenders that day) defeat the collected villains. Leap-Frog then joins another group of villains alongside the Beetle, whom he had fought alongside against the Defenders and now considers a friend. This group targets Iron Man but was defeated. Leap-Frog decides to give up his career as a super-villain, pleading guilty and accepting a prison sentence.

Due to his good behavior, cooperative nature, and the fact that he had never seriously harmed anyone as Leap-Frog, Vincent is released from prison on early parole. He returns home to live with his sister Marie and his son Eugene. Triggered by reminders of a criminal past that now humiliates him, Vincent falls into despair. To show his father that his actions and inventions lead to good results too, Eugene uses the frog-suit to help Spider-Man and Johnny Storm capture Speed Demon. Despite having little understanding or control over the suit's power and endangering himself during the adventure, Eugene decides to become a true superhero using his father's technology and declares himself the "fabulous Frog-Man." While he is proud of his son for helping in the capture of a villain, Vincent insists that superheroics are too dangerous for his well-meaning but unskilled son. Despite his father's wishes, Eugene occasionally adopts the Frog-Man identity again, engaging in several adventures and frequently crossing paths with Spider-Man. Over time, Spider-Man becomes an idol of Eugene's and develops a level of trust and friendship with Vincent.

Despite his objections to his son's efforts at being a superhero, Vincent Patilio studies ways to improve the frog-suit's abilities and power. When the villains White Rabbit and Walrus later target Frog-Man out of a desire for revenge, Vincent Patilio dons a new and improved frog-suit that grants super-human upper body strength and uses computer guidance for more accurate power control and leaping ability. He dons this improved suit and uses it to help Spider-Man fight the White Rabbit and Walrus. Afterward, Vincent allows Eugene to use the improved suit when he wishes. Since then, Vincent Patilio remains retired from criminal activity.

Buford Lange
Buford Lange is an abusive father who lives in Hell's Kitchen with his wife Allison and their autistic son Timmy. He stumbles upon an abandoned Leap-Frog costume and embarks on a short-lived criminal career by robbing small businesses. As Leap-Frog, Lange later engages in a rooftop fight with Daredevil. Timmy, not wishing to see his hero Daredevil hurt, intervenes and electrocutes Lange. Lange then falls to his death, plummeting off the rooftop and into a garbage truck below.

The Hand later employs dark magic to resurrect Lange, among others, and send them to attack the S.H.I.E.L.D. helicarrier. However, most of the resurrected individuals are killed by Wolverine soon afterward.

Leap-Frog in other media
 While he does not appear in the Marvel Cinematic Universe / Disney+ series She-Hulk: Attorney at Law episode "Ribbit and Rip It" (2022), the Vincent Patilio incarnation of Leap-Frog is stated to be a wealthy client of Goodman, Lieber, Kurtzberg & Holliway (GLK&H) and the inspiration behind his son Eugene Patilio becoming the new Leap-Frog.

Leather Boy

Leather Boy (Gene Lorrene) is a fictional villain in Marvel Comics. The character, created by Dan Slott and Paul Pelletier, first appeared in G.L.A. #1 (June 2005).

Gene Lorrene is a BDSM obsessed individual who answered an ad left in the paper by Mister Immortal to join his team the Great Lakes Avengers as Leather Boy. When they discovered that he did not have any superpowers (he misread the ad), he was immediately booted off the team. Much later, Leather Boy, now donning a Doctor Doom-inspired version of his outfit, learned of Squirrel Girl's indoctrination into the team and set out to take revenge. He broke into their base and snapped Mister Immortal's neck, though clearly he did not die, and killed Squirrel Girl's companion Monkey Joe. However, he was immediately stopped by Big Bertha who had just returned from a modeling session, and was defeated by being sat on by her. The rest of the team returned home and interrogated him where he revealed that Doctor Doom had battled the Fantastic Four in Greenwich Village hence why he was wearing a Doom inspired costume, it had been "all the rage" in his area. Leather Boy was dropped off at the police station shortly afterwards.

Leather Boy got out, but Deadpool managed to catch him after the two somehow caused major destruction.

Leather Boy once again tried to take revenge on Squirrel Girl by kidnapping Tippy-Toe at a Deadpool cosplay contest she was hosting. The real Deadpool, who had at that point gained total sympathy for her, caught Leather Boy and proceeded to allow the local squirrels to take revenge for their fallen comrade.

Ganke Lee

Ganke Lee is a fictional supporting character in stories featuring Miles Morales / Spider-Man. The character, created by Brian Michael Bendis and Sara Pichelli, first appeared in Ultimate Comics Spider-Man (vol. 2) #2 (November 2011), which was published as part of Marvel Comics' Ultimate Marvel line of books, which are set in a universe and continuity separate from the "mainstream" Marvel Universe.

Ganke is a black-haired, fat, Asian-American boy and Miles's classmate, best friend and confidant. After the accident behind Miles's superhuman abilities, Ganke is the first one with whom Miles shares this secret, and is the one who immediately suggests that Miles use these new powers as the new Spider-Man. When Marvel Comics ended the Ultimate Marvel imprint with the 2015 "Secret Wars" storyline, in which the Marvel Universe was merged with other alternate universes (including the Ultimate Universe), Molecule Man's efforts transported Miles, Ganke and their respective families and friends to the mainstream universe. Ganke befriends Danika Hart, a YouTuber obsessed with Spider-Man. He acts as an indirect source for Danika, but asks to be called "Ned" rather than use his real name.

Ganke Lee in other media
 The Marvel Cinematic Universe's depiction of Ned Leeds (portrayed by Jacob Batalon) has several elements of Ganke Lee's character, primarily an Asian heritage and technological and software expertise.
 Ganke Lee makes a non-speaking appearance in the 2018 animated film Spider-Man: Into the Spider-Verse. He was originally going to play a more substantial role with Peter Sohn providing his voice, but the filmmakers ultimately decided to develop his character's storyline in future movies due to Ned Leeds' similarities in the MCU.
 Ganke Lee appears as a supporting character in the 2020 video game Spider-Man: Miles Morales, voiced by Griffin Puatu. This version's the first to learn of Miles Morales's abilities and aids the second Spider-Man using his technical and software expertise.

Leech

Ned Leeds

Left Hand

Left Hand (Diego Casseas) is a fictional supervillain from Marvel Comics. The character, created by Fabian Nicieza and Mark Bagley, first appeared in The New Warriors #16 (October 1991).

He is a member of the Folding Circle. Diego Casseas' wife was one of the brides of the Dragon's Breadth cult that Diego's military unit, the "Half-Fulls", encountered in Cambodia during the Vietnam war. The cult had been breeding superhumans for centuries, hoping to tap into the vast power of the Well of All Things, a mystic portal in an ancient temple. The Half-Fulls became part of this breeding program, each member fathering a child with a cult member. Diego's wife died and their daughter was left comatose after the fall of an elevator. Diego, having studied sorcery, stole his daughter's powers ten years later and became the Left Hand. The Left Hand had the ability to access and manipulate the energy of the Darkforce dimension. He used this ability to project blasts of extreme concussive force (sufficient to kill a human being with little effort), and to teleport himself and others over long distances.

Left-Winger

Prudence Leighton

Lei Kung

Leir

Harry Leland

Leo

Daniel Radford

Male android

Female android

Ecliptic

Thanos' Leo

Leonus

Leper Queen

Letha

Libra

Gustav Brandt

Android

Thanos' Libra

Lifeform

Lifeguard

Lightmaster

Tommy Lightning

Lightspeed

Lilith

Lilith Dracul

Demon

Lionheart

Litterbug

Live Wire

Live Wire (Rance Preston) is a fictional character in Marvel Comics. He first appeared in Fantastic Four Annual #5 (November 1967), and was created by Stan Lee and Jack Kirby.

The character subsequently appears in Marvel Two-in-One #70 (December 1980), and then as a member of the Circus of Crime in Ghost Rider (vol. 2) #72-73 (September–October 1982).

Rance Preston was born in Houston, Texas. His weapon is an electrified lariat of which he is a master. He also has various skills that he learned working on a ranch as a cowboy, such as horseback riding. He was once an agent of the Psycho-Man. Live Wire later teamed up with Shellshock, another former agent of the Psycho-Man.

Live Wire frees the Circus of Crime from a prison wagon on its way to the penitentiary, and he then joins the group. The group captures Power Man, but with the help of Black Goliath, Power Man defeats the Circus. Live Wire also fights the original Ghost Rider as part of the Circus of Crime.

While battling John Steele, Live Wire was apparently accidentally eaten by Princess Python's pet snake.

Live Wire has an electrified cable that he uses as a lariat. Anyone ensnared by it suffers damage from the electricity. He wears insulated gloves and clothing that protects him from electricity.

Living Brain

Living Diamond
The Living Diamond first appeared in X-Men #39 (December 1967), and was created by Roy Thomas and Werner Roth. The Living Diamond was a criminal whose latent mutations were activated by exposure to atomic radiation, which gave him flexible living diamond-like hands and telepathic and teleportational powers. After further exposure to radiation, his entire body took on the same diamond-like properties which increased his strength yet slowed him down.

Living Laser

Living Lightning

Living Monolith

Living Tribunal

Lizard

Llan the Sorcerer
Llan the Sorcerer is an extradimensional entity and enemy of Alpha Flight, specifically Talisman. Once every 10,000 years, he manifests on Earth and attempts to corrupt, conquer & annex it into the Twisted Realms, a coalition of predominantly 'evil' dimensions (such as Svartalfheim). This plot culminates in opening The Gateway of Night; a magical nexus point the Twisted Realms can converge at & invade through, located in the northern wastes of Canada. However, by decree of Eternity, he must follow strict ritualistic rules of engagement against a mortal avatar of the Talisman power acting in Earth's defense. Despite ultimately being thwarted each time, his penchant for vast collateral damage was enough to implicate him in "the great devastation" 20,000 years before modern day. Elizabeth Twoyoungmen even implies that Canada's propensity towards eldritch mystical threats stems from Llan's routine incursions.

Llyra

Llyron
Llyron is the son of Llyra, and was genetically accelerated in age by Llyra so that he might take the crown of Atlantis. His mother Llyra was a Lemurian/human hybrid and a foe of Namor. She decided to conceive a child with Namor and introduce him as a successor to the Atlantean throne. After discovering that Namor was sterile, Llyra instead seduced a human named Leon McKenzie to create Llyron. Leon's father Lawrence was Namor's half-brother via their father Leonard, thus making Leon Namor's nephew and by extension Llyron is Namor's great nephew. The Atlantean Council voted Namor off the throne, and declared Llyron to be his rightful heir. However, the sorceress Morgan le Fay raised Atlantis from the ocean floor, and in the resulting chaos Llyron left with a number of Atlantean refugees to find a new home.

Llyron is named after his maternal grandfather Llyron who was Lemurian. His maternal grandmother was a human named Rhonda Morris.

He has resurfaced in the Thunderbolts series, as the leader of Fathom Five, a militant Atlantean splinter group determined to destroy humanity. Llyron was defeated and nearly killed by The Radioactive Man. He escaped and returned to Atlantis, only to discover that he had radiation poisoning, and furthermore had spread the poisoning among the Atlantean population. Radioactive Man was able to reverse the poisoning.

Llyron has super-human strength, agility, endurance, and some resistance to physical and energy attacks. He also possesses gills, allowing him to breathe underwater as well as on land, and can swim incredibly fast compared to humans. Llyron is resistant to cold, presumably another adaptation to undersea life.

Loa

Maximus Lobo

Lobo Brothers

Lockheed

Lockjaw

Locus

Locust

Lodestone

Loki

Raza Longknife

Longshot

Lord Chaos

Lord Dark Wind

Lord Deathstrike

Lord of Light

Lord of Light (Nathan Tyler) is the father of Tandy Bowen in Marvel Comics. The character, created by Bill Mantlo and Bret Blevins, first appeared in Strange Tales (vol. 2) #1 (April 1987).

Tyler married Melissa Bowen and together they had a daughter named Tandy. As time went on, Melissa grew into a hateful materialistic woman, causing Tyler to leave his home for good. He left his entire estate to her while he traveled to India to search for enlightenment.

He studied under several gurus until he learned how to absorb and distribute light. This power caused the negative effect of killing people and thus would initially only use it on the ones who were dying. But as time went on, he started using it on innocents. He gained a following and earned the name the Lord of Light until one day he ran into his daughter and Tyrone Johnson now going by Cloak and Dagger. He temporarily cured Tyrone of the darkness and then tried to convert Tandy so that they could both reach godhood. Tyrone and Tandy battled Tyler who was attempting to drain the light from the latter when his daughter refused. Realizing what he had become, Tyler kills himself by diving into Tyrone's cloak and is devoured by the Predator who lived in the Darkforce Dimension.

Lord of Light in other media
The character renamed Nathan Bowen appears in the live-action series Cloak & Dagger, portrayed by Andy Dylan. This version is a worker at Roxxon. After picking Tandy up from ballet practice, he gets a call about an incident at the Roxxon Gulf Platform and says to shut it down. This leads to a car accident that causes Nathan to drive his car off the bridge. While Tandy survived, Nathan didn't which led to Roxxon confiscating his work from his home much to Melissa's devastation. Nathan was mentioned when Melissa told Brigid O'Reilly that Nathan was posthumously fired from Roxxon and confiscated his work. Tyrone later experience a vision of Tandy being unable to do something as it shows Nathan getting suffocated by Roxxon's executives; this led to Tyrone's Darkforce abilities used to keep Tandy from running away. A hallucination of him is seen when Tandy and Tyrone enter the mind of Ivan Hess (Nathan's co-worker). It is revealed that he had been calling Ivan shortly before the Roxxon Gulf Platform blew up. It is also revealed that Nathan was far from perfect and would hit Melissa, crushing Tandy's view of him. A vision of Nathan is seen when Tandy was out with Andre Deschaine. Tandy enters the Darkforce Dimension and encounters repressed memories on when Nathan and Melissa had their heated arguments. Andre's powers show Tandy in different lives: one is where both Nathan and Billy Johnson survived their encounters and the families grew close, and another has Nathan relocated to Silicon Valley while Tandy follows in his footsteps as a gifted student. The third one had Tandy who left her parents and survived on the streets. Andre creates a manifestation of Nathan to mess with Tandy while Tyrone fights his perfect life counterpart. After a brief trade-off that was undone by Andre, Tandy told the manifestation of her father that he will be better than him as Tandy creates a light sword to use on Nathan's manifestation.

Andy Lorimer

Lorna the Jungle Girl

Lorelei

Lani Ubana

Asgardian

Nancy Lu

James Lucas
James Leonard Lucas (legally changed to James Greary) is a fictional character in Marvel Comics. The character, created by Marcus McLaurin and Dwayne Turner, first appeared in Cage #3 (June 1992).

Lucas joined the police force at a young age and rose in the ranks, eventually becoming a detective. During the 70's, Lucas teamed up with reporter Constance Molina, Blue Marvel, Kaluu, Blade, and the mysterious woman known as The Bear and formed The Mighty Avengers. They disbanded after their first and only mission. James settled down with his wife Esther and they both had two sons: James Lucas Jr. aka Coldfire and Carl Lucas aka Luke Cage. James had a rough relationship with Carl who was always getting arrested due to being in a gang. After his wife's death, James and Carl's relationship was strained even more. Years later, James Jr. joined The Corporation which did not settle well with James Sr. due to its racist history. Luke rescues James Sr. from The Corporation, but is unable to save James Jr. who had transformed into Coldfire. Father and son reconcile, but are driven apart by Esther's memory. Luke asks Jessica Jones to look for James who had remarried and changed his name. Though he refuses to speak to Luke initially, he finally sees his son and asks how life is with the Avengers.

James Lucas in other media
 The character appears in the Ultimate Spider-Man animated series renamed Walter Cage, voiced by Phil LaMarr. He and his wife Amanda are depicted as scientists who created a version of the Super Soldier Serum that was behind their son's powers.
 James Lucas appeared on the live-action series Luke Cage, portrayed by Reg E. Cathey (as one of his final roles prior to his death in February 2018). An unknown actor portrayed the character in season one as a pastor in Savannah, Georgia who was unfaithful to his wife and started an affair with his secretary Dana Stryker, resulting in his eldest son Willis Stryker. Luke Cage mentions to Claire Temple that his father is still alive but cut off all contact after his second son was sent to Seagate. James appears in season two where he and Luke meet each other after all their years of separation. Luke wants nothing to do with him, despite James claiming that he wants to reconnect. After Etta contracted cancer, James angrily blamed his son. Since then, he has regretted it and has tried to make amends. The two finally talk about the wedge driven between them. James and Luke finally make peace with each other and James presumably returns to Georgia. His voice is heard echoing through Luke's ears while sitting as the new owner of Harlem's Paradise.

Lucifer

Lucy in the Sky

Ludi
Ludi is a demon who has clashed with Doctor Strange. Ludi allies himself with the demon known as Dweller-in-Darkness. His power was amplified by the Dweller, who sent him to kill Doctor Strange. The magician and his ally, Clea, used the mystical weapon known as the 'Ebony Blade' to injure Ludi and send him back into his own portal.

Luis
Luis is a fictional character who originated in the Marvel Cinematic Universe before appearing in Marvel comics. The character was created by Edgar Wright, Joe Cornish, Adam McKay and Paul Rudd, and appeared in Ant-Man (2015) and Ant-Man and the Wasp (2018).

Luis in film
Luis is portrayed by Michael Peña in the Marvel Cinematic Universe.

 In Ant-Man (2015), Luis is introduced as Scott Lang's best friend and former cell mate at San Quentin State Prison. Luis' reason for imprisonment was due to him stealing two smoothie machines, which he seems unusually proud of. Due to Scott's estrangement from his ex-wife, Luis lets Scott stay with him and his two friends Dave and Kurt (played by Tip "T.I." Harris and David Dastmalchian respectively). However, Luis' primary reason for doing so was so that Scott could help rob Hank Pym's house. With no other choice, Scott helps him leading into a series of events that starts Scott's eventual reformation and acceptance of the Ant-Man mantle. Later, Scott calls upon Luis and his friends into helping break into Cross Technologies. Luis goes disguised as a security guard and expresses uneasiness, yet excitement at being a "good guy" and then reaffirms this by rescuing a guard he had earlier knocked out. He, along with Dave and Kurt, attempt to aid in Scott's final battle with Darren Cross, but are scared away by the abundance of police officers in the area. Later, Luis informs Scott that he heard that the Falcon was looking for Scott.
 In Ant-Man and the Wasp (2018), Luis founds X-Con Security Consultants along with Scott, Kurt and Dave. Luis conducts business despite Scott being placed under house arrest, and occasionally takes part in playing with Cassie Lang. When Scott arrives with Hope van Dyne and Hank, Luis happily chooses to work with the three in capturing Ava Starr. Later on, however, Luis, Kurt and Dave are captured by Sonny Burch who injects Luis with truth serum to make him reveal where Scott and Hank are. Through effort, Luis gives up Scott and Hank's location to Burch and Ava. Luis, Kurt and Dave take part in the chase through San Francisco, knocking out Burch and using the truth serum for revenge. After Scott is released from house arrest, Luis works alongside his friend and their company is hired for a new business. Luis also lets Scott borrow his van in order to re-enter the quantum realm through a quantum tunnel.

Luis in comics
Luis made his comic book debut in The Astonishing Ant-Man #1 (December 2015), by Nick Spencer and Ramon Rosanas. He is once again Scott Lang's cellmate, but does not have any speaking lines. He does seem to sympathize with Scott, as he looked helpless watching Scott getting beaten up by other inmates.

Luis in other media
Luis appears in Lego Marvel's Avengers, with Michael Peña reprising the role. He narrates the "Ant-Man" DLC.

Aleksander Lukin

Willie Lumpkin

Luna Snow
Seol Hee was an aspiring singer hoping to use her voice and dancing skills to earn enough money to take care of her elderly grandmother, who has raised Seol since the tragic deaths of her parents. When the science-obsessed organization known as A.I.M. ambushed a Stark Industries event where Seol was performing, Seol bravely attempted to defend the attendees, resulting in A.I.M. soldiers locking her in a hi-tech storage freezer. While trying to escape, Seol was exposed to the contents of an advanced cold-fusion energy experiment, which unexpectedly granted her control over frozen elements. Using her newfound powers to fight back, Seol surprised and defeated the A.I.M. forces’ attack. Dubbed "Luna Snow" by the press, Seol's heroic actions made her an overnight sensation, and she now uses her talents and powers as a part-time pop star and full-time Super Hero. The character first appeared in the iOS game Marvel Future Fight, before appearing in the War of the Realms: New Agents of Atlas comic book series in July, 2019. In December 2020, she appeared as a new character in the Mobile IOS game Marvel Super War.

Lunatik

Lupo

Lurking Unknown

Lylla
Lylla is an anthropomorphic otter. Lylla is the C.E.O. of the biggest toy making company in the universe, Mayhem Mekaniks on the planet Halfworld. She is also the friend and lover of Rocket Raccoon. She inherited the company after her parents were murdered by Judson Jakes who wanted control of the company. The only way for Lylla to gain full control was through marriage. Lylla soon came under threat not just through Jakes, but also through Lord Dyvyne as they both wanted to control her toy company. Luckily, Rocket Raccoon came to her aid and with the help of their friends, WalRus and Uncle Pyko, defeated both parties. Lylla traveled with Rocket afterwards to start a new life together. These events were later revealed to be false. Lylla, along with the rest of the halfworlders, were actually service animals who cared for mental patients on their planet. She was also apparently married to Blackjack O'Hare. She has not been seen since, and her marriage to Blackjack seemed retconned as he reappeared as a deadly mercenary and enemy to Rocket.

Lylla in other media

Film
 Lylla appears in Guardians of the Galaxy.

Video games
 Lylla appears in Guardians of the Galaxy: The Telltale Series, voiced by Fryda Wolff.
 Lylla appears in Marvel's Guardians of the Galaxy.

Lyja

Michael Lynch
Michael Lynch is a fictional character in comics produced by Marvel Comics. Created by Mike Carlin and Paul Neary, he first appeared in The Thing #35.

A lieutenant in the United States army, Michael Lynch first appears saving Sharon Ventura from a group of muggers. Later ambushed by the muggers seeking revenge, he is saved by Ben Grimm, who is looking for Sharon himself, trying to prevent her being subject to the Power Broker's augmentation process. The two men rescue an empowered Sharon and take her to safety. On seeing Sharon in a wrestling outfit, Lynch compares her to the heroine Ms. Marvel, prompting Sharon to take it for her own. 

Unbeknownst to Venture or Grimm, Lynch was secretly in league with the Power Broker, as part of a government project to produce a super-soldier, and his encounter with Sharon was part of this plan. Lynch betrays Sharon, returning her to the Power Broker for experimentation, where she is found by Captain America in a brainwashed state. Lynch has the super-soldier G.I. Max attack Captain America in an attempt to cover up his treachery, but in trying to shoot him fatally wounds G.I. Max instead. Lynch is arrested and put in prison.

References

Marvel Comics characters: L, List of